In an electric power system, overcurrent or excess current is a situation where a larger than intended electric current exists through a conductor, leading to excessive generation of heat, and the risk of fire or damage to equipment. Possible causes for overcurrent include short circuits, excessive load, incorrect design, an arc fault, or a ground fault. Fuses, circuit breakers, and current limiters are commonly used overcurrent protection (OCP) mechanisms to control the risks.
Circuit breakers, relays, and fuses protect circuit wiring from damage caused by overcurrent.

Related standards
IEC 60364-4-43: Electrical installations of buildings – Part 4-43: Protection for safety – Protection against overcurrent

See also
 Current limiting
 Electrical fault
 Electrical safety
 Overvoltage

References 

Electrical systems